Herbert Cecil Manners (16 August 1877 – 30 December 1955) was an English cricketer. Manners was a right-handed batsman who fielded occasionally as a wicket-keeper. He was born at Hartley Wintney, Hampshire, and was educated at Cheltenham College.

Manners made his first-class debut for Gloucestershire against Warwickshire in 1902 County Championship. He made two further first-class appearances for the county in that season, against Worcestershire and Somerset, while the following season he played once against the touring Gentlemen of Philadelphia. A fifth and final first-class appearance later came for the county in 1911, against Cambridge University. In his five first-class matches for Gloucestershire, he scored a total of 60 runs at an average of 7.50, with a high score of 32.

He died at West Worthing, Sussex, on 30 December 1955.

References

External links
Herbert Manners at ESPNcricinfo
Herbert Manners at CricketArchive

1877 births
1955 deaths
People from Hartley Wintney
People educated at Cheltenham College
English cricketers
Gloucestershire cricketers
Sportspeople from Gloucestershire